Panov  (masculine; Пано́в) or Panova (feminine; Пано́ва) is a Slavic surname, most common in Russia, Bulgaria and North Macedonia. Notable people with the surname include:

Aleksandr Panov (diplomat) (born 1944), Russian diplomat
Aleksandr Panov (handballer) (born 1946), Russian handball player
Aleksandr Panov (footballer) (born 1975), Russian football player
Alexandra Panova (born 1989), Russian tennis player
Alina Panova, American film and stage costume designer and producer
Angelko Panov (born 1979), Macedonian football player
Anton Panov (1906–1967), Macedonian writer
Asparuh Panov, Bulgarian politician
Bianka Panova (born 1970), Bulgarian individual rhythmic gymnast
Dimitar Panov (1902–1985), Bulgarian film and theater actor and director
Greta Panova (born 1983), Bulgarian-American mathematician
Konstantin Panov, Russian ice hockey player
Mikhail Panov (1901–1979), Soviet Army general
Olga Panova (born 1987), Russian tennis player
Pavel Panov (born 1950), Bulgarian football player and coach
Sergei Panov (disambiguation) – multiple people
Svetlana Panova, Russian figure skating coach 
Tatiana Panova (born 1976), Russian tennis player
Tsvetomir Panov (born 1989), Bulgarian football player
Vadim Panov, Russian fantasy and science fiction writer
Valery Panov (born 1938) Russian-born Israeli dancer and choreographer
Vasily Panov (1906–1973), Soviet chess player
Vera Panova (1905–1973), Soviet Russian writer
Vitali Panov (born 1979), Russian football player and coach
Yelena Panova (disambiguation)  – multiple people

Russian-language surnames